Tenants and Owners Development Corporation, also known as TODCO, is a nonprofit organization that owns eight low-income apartment buildings in the South of Market neighborhood of San Francisco, California. Founded to oppose the redevelopment of the Yerba Buena corridor, the organization is a prominent and influential opponent of housing construction in San Francisco. 

John Elberling, the president of TODCO, joined the group in 1978 In 2021, the San Francisco Chronicle wrote that Eberling's "power to shape what does and does not get built in the South of Market has grown in recent years as he has spent freely on propositions, polling, lobbying and lawsuits." Elberling lives rent-free in one of TODCO's affordable housing units, despite the fact that his salary is four times higher than the income he would need to qualify for the building. He also owns a 2,938-square-foot house in Sebastopol, in Sonoma County, California.

History 
In the 1980s and 1990s, TODCO built a set of low-income apartment buildings, concentrated on Sixth Street. Since the early 2000s, the organization has not built more housing, but remains active in local politics. The organization derives resources from the rising value of its properties, a consequence of skyrocketing property prices in San Francisco. The organization has used these resources to lobby against housing construction, as well as fund various other propositions. The organization has been criticized for using the windfalls of its operation on political advocacy rather than on its properties and resident services.

In 2015, TODCO supported a proposal to ban the construction of market-rate housing in the Mission District.

Controversies 
In 2020, San Francisco Board of Supervisors member Dean Preston convinced colleagues on the board to delay approval for thousands of housing units on underdeveloped lots on South Van Ness Avenue so that TODCO could perform a race and equity study on the project within six months. TODCO agreed to do the study. More than two years later, TODCO had not begun the study and the organization said it had no intent to do so.

In 2021, TODCO took a leading role in opposing the construction of a 495-unit apartment complex (25% of which would have been affordable housing) on a Nordstrom valet parking lot. As of 2022, that campaign is implicated in an ethics complaint about whether former Supervisor Jane Kim violated the law by not registering as a lobbyist for work opposing it. 

On August 6, 2021, TODCO's Director of Community Development, Jon Jacobo, was accused of rape by a Bay Area housing activist. The activist's accusation included screenshots of text messages between the accuser and Jacobo, as well as test results from the accuser’s rape kit. In response to the allegations, Jacobo acknowledged a relationship with the accuser, but stated his belief that the relationship was consensual. Since the initial allegation of rape against Jacobo, the San Francisco Women’s Political Committee (SFWPC) stated that “other women have come forward to our organization regarding their own experiences with Jacobo. The size and scale of harm alleged is greater than anyone knew.”  At the request of President Shamann Walton of San Francisco’s Board of Supervisors, Jacobo resigned from his seat on the Building Inspection Commission for the City & County of San Francisco. TODCO has not released a statement in response to the allegations, and the organization continues to employ Jacobo. 

In 2022, TODCO sponsored a San Francisco ballot measure, Proposition K, to tax e-commerce companies to fund a guaranteed basic income program. While originally intended to target large corporations such as Amazon, opponents later noted it was unlikely that the tax would apply to Amazon because more than 80% of its revenue comes from web services, exempting it from e-commerce taxes. Instead, Prop K would have raised taxes on many small businesses. On September 1, TODCO and Elberling successfully challenged their own measure in court to have it removed from the ballot. Although Elberling said, "Yes, it hurts to have made such a public mistake and have spent almost $450,000 on a flawed measure,” he intends to attempt to rework the tax for a new proposition next year that will target major corporations rather than small businesses.

References 

Non-profit organizations based in San Francisco